Yoel Armando Tapia Gómez (born September 11, 1984 in Monte Cristi) is a Dominican sprinter, who specialized in the 400 metres. He won two medals for the national relay team at the 2007 Pan American Games in Rio de Janeiro, Brazil, and also, at the 2011 Pan American Games in Guadalajara, Mexico.

Tapia competed for the men's 4 × 400 m relay at the 2008 Summer Olympics in Beijing, along with his teammates Pedro Mejía, Arismendy Peguero, and Carlos Yohelin Santa. He ran on the anchor leg of the second heat, with an individual-split time of 45.79 seconds. Tapia and his team finished the relay in last place for a seasonal best time of 3:04.31, failing to advance into the final.

References

External links

NBC 2008 Olympics profile

Dominican Republic male sprinters
Living people
Olympic athletes of the Dominican Republic
Athletes (track and field) at the 2008 Summer Olympics
People from Monte Cristi Province
1984 births
Pan American Games silver medalists for the Dominican Republic
Pan American Games bronze medalists for the Dominican Republic
Pan American Games medalists in athletics (track and field)
Athletes (track and field) at the 2007 Pan American Games
World Athletics Indoor Championships medalists
Medalists at the 2007 Pan American Games
Central American and Caribbean Games medalists in athletics